Maen Huail is a stone block at St Peter's Square, in the centre of Ruthin, Denbighshire, North Wales. A circular plaque next to it states "Maen Huail on which tradition states, King Arthur beheaded Huail, brother of Gildas the historian". The stone was recorded in 1699 as being in the middle of the road, and now stands on a concrete plinth against the half-timbered wall of the Barclays Bank building, a 20th-century copy of the now mainly destroyed Exmewe Hall.

The legend probably originated as an oral tradition, and is first recorded in the Chronicle of Six Ages of the World by Elis Gruffydd, dating to around 1550. The stone itself is thought more likely to be  a market or civic stone, or a preaching stone.

See also
List of Scheduled Monuments in Denbighshire

References

Ruthin
Buildings and structures in Denbighshire
Scheduled monuments in Denbighshire
Stones